The 2018–19 Texas State Bobcats women's basketball team represents Texas State University in the 2018–19 NCAA Division I women's basketball season. The Bobcats, led by seventh year head coach Zenarae Antoine, play their home games at Strahan Coliseum and were members of the Sun Belt Conference. They finished the season 14–17, 9–9 in Sun Belt play to finish in a tie for sixth place. They lost in the second round of the Sun Belt women's tournament to South Alabama.

Roster

Schedule

|-
!colspan=9 style=| Non-conference regular season

|-
!colspan=9 style=| Sun Belt regular season

|-
!colspan=9 style=| Sun Belt Women's Tournament

See also
 2018–19 Texas State Bobcats men's basketball team

References

Texas State
Texas State Bobcats women's basketball seasons